Jacques Morel (born 22 September 1935) is a French rower who competed in the 1960 Summer Olympics and in the 1964 Summer Olympics.

He was born in La Teste-de-Buch. In 1960 he was a crew member of the French boat that won the silver medal in the coxed four event. Four years later he won his second silver medal with the French boat in the coxed pair competition partnered with his younger brother Georges Morel.

References

External links
 

1935 births
Living people
People from Arcachon
French male rowers
Olympic rowers of France
Rowers at the 1960 Summer Olympics
Rowers at the 1964 Summer Olympics
Olympic silver medalists for France
Olympic medalists in rowing
Knights of the Ordre national du Mérite
World Rowing Championships medalists for France
Medalists at the 1964 Summer Olympics
Medalists at the 1960 Summer Olympics
Sportspeople from Gironde
20th-century French people